Elliott J. Schuchardt (born September 26, 1966) is an American civil liberties activist.

Schuchardt is best known for filing a lawsuit against the federal government, which contends that the United States is unlawfully collecting and searching the national e-mail database.  That lawsuit is currently pending in the U.S. District Court for the Western District of Pennsylvania.

In 2015, Schuchardt filed and argued the case that obtained the injunction that prevented Sweet Briar College, located in Amherst, Virginia, from closing its doors after more than a century.

Mr. Schuchardt has been temporarily suspended from the practice of law in Pennsylvania and Tennessee.  Schuchardt had filed a complaint against a federal judge, who had issued 87 rules to show cause -- on her own initiative -- to benefit a court insider.  The insider was paid $200,000 as a result of the judge's unsolicited orders.  Schuchardt claimed that the judge's orders were an abuse of civil process, and had been entered in violation of the federal Code of Judicial Ethics.  He was denied a hearing in connection with the judge's attacks on his license to practice law.  In early January 2023, the Supreme Court of Tennessee refused to give Schuchardt a hearing in connection with his license.  This matter is currently being litigated in the U.S. District Court for the Middle District of Tennessee under the case, Schuchardt v. Tennessee.

Government surveillance litigation

On June 5, 2013, former government contractor, Edward Snowden, publicly alleged that the United States government was storing and unlawfully searching e-mail of United States citizens.  Snowden claimed that the government's actions were a violation of the Fourth Amendment, which prohibits the federal government from conducting a search of a person's private papers without first obtaining a warrant from a magistrate.  Snowden ultimately fled to Russia to avoid prosecution for disclosing this information.

A year later, on June 2, 2014, attorney Elliott Schuchardt filed suit against President Barack Obama and several senior government officials contending that the federal government was improperly collecting and "data-mining" the national e-mail database.  The case is currently pending in the United States District Court for the Western District of Pennsylvania, under docket number 2:14-cv-00705-CB.

The lawsuit was initially dismissed by the District Court on the ground that Schuchardt did not have standing to pursue the case.  On October 5, 2016, the United States Court of Appeals for the Third Circuit reversed, finding that Schuchardt had stated a prima facie case, and did have at least facial standing to continue with the lawsuit.  The Third Circuit remanded the case to the District Court to consider the factual basis for Schuchardt's allegations more closely.

While the case was pending, Schuchardt received the assistance of William Binney, a former technical director at the National Security Agency.  While at the NSA, Binney was responsible for handling all technical issues relating to the acquisition, development and distribution of "signals intelligence" for the agency's 6,000 analysts.  These analysts were responsible for analysis and reporting for the entire world.  During 2000-01, Binney's team developed the program that first enabled the National Security Agency to datamine e-mail.  His story is documented in the Oliver Stone film, A Good American.

On July 5, 2017, Schuchardt filed with the District Court an affidavit prepared by William Binney.  In the affidavit, Binney alleges that the United States government is both collecting and unlawfully searching the national e-mail database.  The District Court has not yet ruled on the government's renewed motion to dismiss.

On May 23, 2017, the U.S. Court of Appeals for the Fourth Circuit relied upon the Third Circuit's opinion in Schuchardt v. Obama, to reinstate the complaint in a similar lawsuit filed by the Wikimedia Foundation.

On February 4, 2019, the U.S. District Court for the Western District of Pennsylvania dismissed the case on standing grounds.  Schuchardt, working in cooperation with a group of retired intelligence officers, appealed the court's decision to the U.S. Court of Appeals for the Third Circuit.

Sweet Briar College litigation

Sweet Briar College is a women's liberal arts college located in Amherst, Virginia.

On March 3, 2015, the President of the college, James F. Jones, announced that Sweet Briar would close after more than a century.  In the announcement, Jones cited declining enrollment and an endowment insufficient to cover potentially large-scale changes needed to boost enrollment.

On March 30, 2015, Schuchardt filed a lawsuit against Sweet Briar College on behalf of Jessica Campbell, an alumna of the college.  The lawsuit alleged that Sweet Briar's decision to close had damaged the value of Campbell's university degree.  Schuchardt subsequently filed an amended complaint on behalf of a number of current and former students of the college.

On April 29, 2015, Schuchardt obtained an injunction on behalf of the student / alumnae group, which prevented Sweet Briar College's board from taking any further action to close the school.

Schuchardt's group later participated in negotiations involving the board of directors of Sweet Briar College, the Virginia Attorney General's Office, the County Attorney for Amherst County, Virginia, and an alumnae group called "Saving Sweet Briar.

On June 20, 2015, the Virginia Attorney General's office announced a mediated agreement to keep Sweet Briar College open for the 2015–16 academic year.  The agreement called for Sweet Briar College president James Jones to resign.  Sweet Briar College remains open today.

National Rifle Association Litigation

Schuchardt currently represents millionaire activist, David Dell'Aquila, in a class action lawsuit filed against the National Rifle Association and its President, Wayne LaPierre.

David Dell’Aquila, a Nashville-based retired technology consultant who has given roughly $100,000 to the NRA, had previously pledged give “the bulk of an estate worth several million dollars" to the NRA.

The complaint in the case contends that the National Rifle Association and its President, Wayne LaPierre, fraudulently solicited donations from donors during the period from 2016 through 2019, because the NRA knew that the donations would not be used for the purposes solicited.

Awards and recognition

 In 2015, Sweet Briar College recognized attorney Schuchardt as having played a major role in preventing the college from closing.
 In 2016, Schuchardt was invited to speak at a seminar at the British House of Lords concerning the government surveillance litigation.

Personal life

Schuchardt has retired from the practice of law.  He is currently writing a book that questions the use of the U.S. dollar as a major reserve currency.

References

Privacy activists
Living people
1966 births
American lawyers
American activists
Cornell University alumni
Columbia Law School alumni